The Indian National Congress was formed in 1885, in 1907 it split into two faction, extremists — Garam Dal (hot faction) led by Tilak and moderates Naram Dal (soft faction) led by Gokhale. They were termed so because of their attitude towards the British rule. The Garam Dal is considered as a triumvirate comprising apart from Tilak, Lala Lajpat Rai and Bipinchandra Pal. According to Bhatt and Bhargava, the differences between the two factions of the Congress paralyzed it, due to which "the agitation for independence ran out of steam and it remained so till the end of the first world war". The Naram Dal of the Congress helped the British in its war effort, on the other hand the Garam Dal led by Tilak and Annie Beasant started the Home Rule League agitation in 1917. Asghar Ali Engineer writes that the Garam Dal separated itself from the Congress, after the differences that came to fore during the Congress session of Surat in 1907. Motilal Nehru until 1915, was a follower of the moderates, however under persuasion of his son Jawaharlal Nehru, his politics led him to join the Garam Dal.

References

See also
 Bal Gangadhar Tilak
 Indian National Congress

Political party factions in India
Political parties established in 1907
Indian National Congress
Indian independence movement
1907 establishments in India